Head of the State is the second album released by rap group, Cali Agents. It was released on March 9, 2004 for Pockets Linted Entertainment and was produced by Champ!, Vin Roc, Superflexxxx, Richness, Brisk One and Architect.

Track listing
"Intro" - 0:51  
"Sharp" - 3:29  
"Cali Nights" - 3:33  
"In the Zone" - 4:31  
"Rawrap" - 3:50  
"Go Ladies" - 3:26  
"Banger" - 3:39  
"Head of the State" - 4:05  
"Endless" (Bonus Track) - 4:23

References

2004 albums
Cali Agents albums